Amjad Al-Shuaibi is a Jordanian footballer of Palestinian origin. He plays as an attacking midfielder for Al-Ramtha SC.

References 
 SC Officially Sign Up Amjad Al-Shuaibi

External links
 
 
 Amjad Al-Shuaibi on Facebook

Association football midfielders
Jordanian footballers
Jordan international footballers
Al-Hazem F.C. players
Sportspeople from Amman
Living people
1979 births
Saudi First Division League players